Gordon William Hanson (July 18, 1943 – August 30, 2020) was a Canadian politician. He served in the Legislative Assembly of British Columbia from 1979 to 1991, as a NDP member for the constituency of Victoria.

References

1943 births
2020 deaths
British Columbia New Democratic Party MLAs
Politicians from Vancouver
Politicians from Victoria, British Columbia